Zagazig University is a public university located in the city of Zagazig, Egypt.

Notable alumni
Hany Mohammed Diab – actress
Ayman Al-Hendy – academic, scientist
Muntaser Ibrahim – geneticist

See also

 List of universities in Egypt
 List of medical schools in Egypt

External links 
 Zagazig University
 Zagazig University at Canadian-Universities-Net.

 
Educational institutions established in 1974
1974 establishments in Egypt
Universities in Egypt